Eric Fellner,  (born 10 October 1959) is a British film producer. He is the co-chairman (along with Tim Bevan) of the production company Working Title Films.

Early life and education 
Fellner was born to a Jewish family in England. From 1972 to 1977, he was educated at Cranleigh School, a boarding independent school for boys (now co-educational), in Surrey in South East England, followed by the Guildhall School of Music and Drama in London.

Career 
Among Fellner's more than 60 films as producer or executive producer are Moonlight and Valentino, Four Weddings and a Funeral, Dead Man Walking, Fargo, Notting Hill, Billy Elliot, United 93, Bridget Jones's Diary, Bridget Jones: The Edge of Reason, Frost/Nixon and Senna.

Working Title Films signed a deal with Universal Studios in 1999 for a reported US$600 million, which gave Bevan and Fellner the power to commission projects with a budget of up to $35 million without having to consult their paymasters. It is now Britain's largest production company with offices in London and Los Angeles. Successes include Four Weddings and a Funeral (1994) which has grossed over US$250 million worldwide. Dead Man Walking and Fargo won Oscars in 1996 and 1997 respectively, while Elizabeth (1998), Atonement (2007) and Frost/Nixon were all nominated for the Best Picture Academy Award.

Recognition 
 He was awarded the C.B.E. (Commander of the Order of the British Empire) in the 2005 Queen's Birthday Honours List for his services to the British film industry.
 In 2013, he and Bevan received the David O. Selznick Achievement Award in Theatrical Motion Pictures from the Producers Guild of America.
 In 2013, he was Awarded a Career Achievement Award at Zurich Film Festival.
 2018: Cinematic Production Award of the Royal Photographic Society

Personal life 
Fellner is a good friend of Hugh Grant, who is the star of some of Working Title's biggest box office hits. Fellner and his long-time partner, model Laura Bailey, have five children together and live in London.

Filmography

Film

Television 
Executive producerProducer' Frankie's House (1992) (Television film)

Thanks
 Independent Lens'' (2005) (Documentary)

References

External links 
 Working Title Films
 

1959 births
Commanders of the Order of the British Empire
English film producers
English television producers
Living people
People educated at Cranleigh School
Filmmakers who won the Best Film BAFTA Award
Golden Globe Award-winning producers
Place of birth missing (living people)
English Jews
Tony Award winners
Working Title Films